Lisa Aldenhoven (born c.1958) is an Australian film and television actress.

Career
Aldenhoven remains best known for her role in the television soap opera The Young Doctors as Nurse Julie Holland. She appeared in the series from 1978 to 1981.

Aldenhoven made a guest appearance in Prisoner, appearing in the first episode as ill-fated inmate Sally Lee. She was invited back several years later to play another guest role. She also had guest roles in the first two episodes of Cop Shop – as a child prostitute and in later episodes as a pregnant school girl;  Carson's Law; Holiday Island; I Can Jump Puddles; Truckies; Special Squad and Who's Baby.

She has also appeared in several movies, including Mad Max, The Getting of Wisdom, Blue Fire Lady, Death of a Soldier and Brilliant Lies.

She now works in PR and marketing.

References

External links
 

Living people
Year of birth missing (living people)
Australian film actresses
Australian soap opera actresses
20th-century Australian actresses
21st-century Australian actresses